Tomislav Perić (born 10 April 1983) is a Croatian former professional tennis player.

A Junior Davis Cup representative for Croatia, Perić reached a best singles world ranking of 342 on the professional tour, winning four ITF Futures titles. He was a semi-finalist at the 2004 Dubrovnik Challenger and qualified for his only ATP Tour main draw at the 2006 Grand Prix Hassan II.

Perić is a former coach of British player James Ward.

ITF Futures titles

Singles: (4)

References

External links
 
 

1983 births
Living people
Croatian male tennis players
Croatian tennis coaches